The Brave and the Bold is a comic book series published by DC Comics as an ongoing series from 1955 to 1983. It was followed by two mini-series in 1991 and 1999, and was revived as an ongoing title in 2007. The focus of the series has varied over time, but it most commonly features team-ups of characters from across the DC Universe.

Publication history

Volume 1
The first volume of the series ran for 200 issues from August/September 1955 to July 1983. Originally, The Brave and the Bold was an anthology series featuring adventure tales from past ages with characters such as the Silent Knight, the Viking Prince, the Golden Gladiator, and Robin Hood. With issue #25, the series was reinvented as a try-out title for new characters and concepts, starting with the Suicide Squad created by writer Robert Kanigher and artist Ross Andru. Gardner Fox and Joe Kubert created a new version of Hawkman in issue #34 (February–March 1961) with the character receiving his own title three years later.

Editor Julius Schwartz hired Gardner Fox and artist Mike Sekowsky to create the Justice League of America. The team debuted in The Brave and the Bold #28 (February–March 1960), and after two further appearances in the title, received its own series.

Issues #45 through #49 (Dec. 1962/Jan. 1963 through Aug./Sept. 1963) were devoted to "Strange Sports Stories", combining sport and science-fiction in tales such as "Challenge of the Headless Baseball Team" and "The Man Who Drove Through Time". Ten years later, in 1973, Strange Sports Stories was resurrected as a DC Comics title in its own right, but it lasted only six issues.

The series was changed yet again with issue #50 as a team-up title between established characters. Starting with issue #59 The Brave and the Bold became, more specifically, a Batman team-up book with the Caped Crusader as the book's main focus. This was due to the popularity of the Batman television series. After issue #74, The Brave and the Bold was exclusively a Batman team-up title until it ended with issue #200.

The teaming of Robin, Kid Flash, and Aqualad in issue #54 (June–July 1964) by writer Bob Haney and artist Bruno Premiani led to the creation of the Teen Titans. The three heroes subsequently appeared under the name "Teen Titans" in issue #60 (June–July 1965) by Haney and artist Nick Cardy and were joined by Wonder Woman's younger sister Wonder Girl in her first appearance.

The Metamorpho character was created by Haney and artist Ramona Fradon in The Brave and the Bold #57 (December 1964–January 1965).

The title was the first to feature Neal Adams' version of Batman,  generating fan interest that led to Adams' style defining the modern Batman image to this day. In addition, Adams updated Green Arrow's visual appearance by designing a new costume for the character in issue #85 (August–September 1969). The primary artist for the second half of the run was Jim Aparo, starting with #98 (October–November 1971). Haney frequently disregarded continuity by scripting stories which contradicted DC's canon or by writing major heroes in an out-of-character fashion. Issue #100 (Feb.–March 1972) featured Batman and "4 Famous Co-Stars" (Green Lantern, Green Arrow, Black Canary, and Robin) in a story by Haney and Aparo. Issues #112 (April–May 1974) to #117 (Feb.–March 1975) of the series were in the 100 Page Super Spectacular format.

The character Nemesis, also known as Thomas Tresser, debuted in an eight-page backup story in issue #166 (September 1980) written by Cary Burkett and drawn by Dan Spiegle. The Tresser character was created by Burkett in 1979, and named for an actor with whom Burkett was rooming in New Hampshire.

Alan Brennert wrote four issues of The Brave and the Bold featuring Batman teaming with the Creeper, Hawk and Dove, the Robin of Earth-Two, and the Catwoman. 
 
The title's final issue featured a team-up of the Batmen of Earth-One and Earth-Two and included a preview of Batman and the Outsiders, the title that replaced The Brave and the Bold on DC's schedule and became Aparo's next regular assignment.

Full list of issues

Volume 2
In December 1991–June 1992, The Brave and the Bold returned as a six-issue miniseries featuring Green Arrow, the Question, and the Butcher. The miniseries was written by Mike Grell and Mike Baron.

Flash and Green Lantern: The Brave and the Bold
A six-issue miniseries was published from October 1999–March 2000 starring the Flash and Green Lantern titled Flash and Green Lantern: The Brave and the Bold. This miniseries was written by Mark Waid and Tom Peyer with art by Barry Kitson and Tom Grindberg. A trade paperback of this mini-series was published in 2001.

The title was used again in 2001 for The Brave and the Bold Annual #1 (1969), a one-shot special that reprinted selected Silver Age team-ups. The book was designed in the 1960s-style "80-Page Giant" format as if it were an actual annual issue of the original run of the title, which did not have an annual in 1969.

Volume 3
DC resurrected the Brave and the Bold title as another ongoing series in April 2007. Deciding that it would be a random team-up series, and not a Batman team-up series, the first writer was Mark Waid, who remained on the title for its first 16 issues. The first arc, "The Lords of Luck", involved Batman in a team-up with Green Lantern Hal Jordan. The story depicted the characters joining forces with various other characters in tracking down the book of Destiny, with appearances by Supergirl, Lobo, Blue Beetle, the Legion of Super Heroes, Adam Strange, and the Challengers of the Unknown. The second arc picked up threads from the first, but mainly focused on self-contained stories.

After Waid's departure, Marv Wolfman took over for a two-part storyline, involving Supergirl and Raven battling the son of Triumph, while David Hine and Doug Braithwaite did a four-issue arc on the series featuring Hal Jordan and the Phantom Stranger. Following this, Dan Jurgens wrote issue #23, featuring Booster Gold and Magog. Like Wolfman's run, this era was prominent for its team-ups between DC heroes and the characters of Milestone Media. Writer Matt Wayne and artist Howard Porter collaborated on a team-up between Static and Black Lightning, and Adam Beechen and Roger Robinson wrote another featuring Hardware and Blue Beetle. The final Milestone issue was a team-up between Xombi and the Spectre, by John Rozum and Scott Hampton.

In September 2009, the title was taken over by J. Michael Straczynski and artist Jesus Saiz with issue #27, which featured a team-up between Batman and Dial H For Hero. Similar to the Milestone issues, it was intended for Straczynski's run on the series to showcase the Red Circle Comics characters licensed from Archie Comics. This idea was ultimately scrapped. Following the first issue, Straczynski wrote team-ups between: Barry Allen and Blackhawk; the Joker and the Atom; Hal Jordan and Doctor Fate; Batman and Brother Power; Aquaman and Etrigan; and Barbara Gordon, Wonder Woman, and Zatanna, which served as a companion piece to Alan Moore's Batman: The Killing Joke graphic novel.

Batman and Wonder Woman 
In 2018, DC released a limited series starring Batman and Wonder Woman.

The Doomed and the Damned 
In October 2020, DC released an 80-Page Giant called The Doomed and the Damned.

Batman: The Brave and the Bold 
In November 2022, it was announced that a new series entitled Batman: The Brave and the Bold would release in May 2023 as a part of the Dawn of DC relaunch, with the creative team consisting of Tom King, Mitch Gerads, Guillem March, Gabriel Hardman, Dan Mora and Rob Williams.

Collected editions
 Batman: The Brave and the Bold—The Bronze Age Omnibus
 Vol. 1 collects The Brave and the Bold #74-106. 904 pages, January 2017, 
 Vol. 2 collects The Brave and the Bold #110-156. 776 pages, September 2018, 
 Vol. 3 collects The Brave and the Bold #157-200. 904 pages, September 2021, 
 The Viking Prince by Joe Kubert collects The Brave and the Bold #1-5 and 7-24, 296 pages, July 2010, 
 Showcase Presents: Justice League of America Volume 1 includes The Brave and the Bold #28–30, 544 pages, December 2005, 
 Suicide Squad: The Silver Age collects The Brave and the Bold #25–27 and #37–39, 336 pages, July 2016, 
 Showcase Presents: Hawkman
 Volume 1 includes The Brave and the Bold #34–36, #42–44, and 51, 560 pages, March 2007, 
 Volume 2 includes The Brave and the Bold #70, 560 pages, August 2008,  
 Showcase Presents: Green Arrow Volume 1 includes The Brave and the Bold #50, #71, #85, 528 pages, January 2006, 
 The Brave and the Bold Team-Up Archives Volume 1 collects The Brave and the Bold #50–56, #59, 224 pages, June 2005, 
 Showcase Presents: Aquaman
 Volume 2 includes The Brave and the Bold #51, 528 pages, January 2008,  
 Volume 3 includes The Brave and the Bold #73, 448 pages, February 2009, 
 Showcase Presents: Haunted Tank Volume 1 includes The Brave and the Bold #52, 560 pages, May 2006, 
 Showcase Presents: The Teen Titans 
 Volume 1 includes The Brave and the Bold #54 and #60, 528 pages, April 2006, 
 Volume 2 includes The Brave and the Bold #83 and #94, 512 pages, October 2007,   
 Showcase Presents: Metal Men
 Volume 1 includes The Brave and the Bold #55, 528 pages, September 2007, 
 Volume 2 includes The Brave and the Bold #66, 528 pages, September 2008,  
 Showcase Presents: Metamorpho Volume 1 collects The Brave and the Bold #57–58, #66, and #68, 560 pages, October 2005, 
 Showcase Presents: The Brave and the Bold – The Batman Team-Ups
 Volume 1 collects The Brave and the Bold #59, #64, #67, #69–71, #74–87, 528 pages, January 2007, 
 Volume 2 collects The Brave and the Bold #88–108, 528 pages, December 2007, 
 Volume 3 collects The Brave and the Bold #109–134, 520 pages, December 2008, 
 Black Canary Archives Volume 1 includes The Brave and the Bold #61–62, 224 pages, December 2000, 
 Showcase Presents: The Spectre Volume 1 includes The Brave and the Bold #72, 75, 116, 180, and 199, 616 pages, April 2012,  
 The Spectre: The Wrath of the Spectre Omnibus includes The Brave and the Bold #72, 75, 116, 180, and 199; 680 pages, September 2020, 
 Deadman Omnibus includes The Brave and the Bold #79, 86, 104, and 133; 944 pages, December 2020, 
 The Phantom Stranger Omnibus collects #89, 98, and 145; 1,184 pages, May 2022, 
 Legends of the Dark Knight: Jim Aparo 
 Volume 1 collects The Brave and the Bold #98, 100–102, and 104–122, 512 pages, April 2012,  
 Volume 2 collects The Brave and the Bold #123-145 and 147–151, 528 pages, October 2013, 
 Volume 3 collects The Brave and the Bold #152, 154–178, 180–182, 552 pages, September 2017, 
 Joker: The Bronze Age Omnibus includes The Brave and the Bold #111, 118, 129-130, 141, 191; 832 pages, August 2019, 
 Batman: The Strange Deaths of Batman includes The Brave and the Bold #115, 160 pages, January 2009,  
 Tales of the Batman: Don Newton includes The Brave and the Bold #153, 156 and 165, 360 pages, December 2011,  
 Tales of the Batman: Gerry Conway Volume 1 includes The Brave and the Bold #158, 161, 171–174; 464 pages, July 2017, 
 Batman Arkham: Ra's al Ghul includes The Brave and the Bold #159, March 2019, 232 pages, 
 Legends of the Dark Knight: José Luis García-López includes The Brave and the Bold #164 and 171, November 2021, 472 pages, 
 Tales of the Batman: Alan Brennert includes The Brave and the Bold #178, 181–182, 197; 208 pages, July 2016, 
 Batman: Secrets of the Batcave includes The Brave and the Bold #182, 192 pages, August 2007, 
 Batman Arkham: The Riddler includes The Brave and the Bold #183, 296 pages, May 2015, 
 The Greatest Batman Stories Ever Told includes The Brave and the Bold #197, 360 pages, December 1988,  
 DC Through the 80s: The End of Eras includes The Brave and the Bold #200, 520 pages, December 2020, 
 Showcase Presents: Batman and the Outsiders Volume 1 includes the backup story from The Brave and the Bold #200, 552 pages, September 2007, 
 Batman and the Outsiders Volume 1 includes the backup story from The Brave and the Bold #200, 368 pages, February 2017, 
 The Brave and the Bold
 Volume 1: The Lords of Luck collects The Brave and the Bold vol. 3 #1–6, 160 pages, December 2007, 
 Volume 2: The Book of Destiny collects The Brave and the Bold vol. 3 #7–12, 160 pages, August 2008, 
 Volume 3: Demons and Dragons collects The Brave and the Bold vol. 3 #13–16; The Brave and the Bold #181; The Flash vol. 2 #107; and Impulse #17, 168 pages, April 2009,  
 Volume 4: Without Sin collects The Brave and the Bold vol. 3 #17–22, 144 pages, July 2009,  
 Volume 5: Milestone collects The Brave and the Bold vol. 3 #24–26; Hardware #16; Static #12; and Xombi #6, 160 pages, February 2010,  
 Team-Ups of the Brave and the Bold collects The Brave and the Bold vol. 3 #27–33, 176 pages, August 2011,  
 Booster Gold: Volume 4: Day of Death includes The Brave and the Bold vol. 3 #23, 160 pages, April 2010,

Awards
The series won Alley Awards in 1962 for "Best Single Comic Book Cover" (#42 by Joe Kubert), in 1965 for "Best Comic Book Cover" (#61 by Murphy Anderson), and in 1968 for "Best Full-Length Story" ("Track of the Hook" in #79 by Bob Haney and Neal Adams). Issue #28 of the third series (the Flash and Blackhawk team-up) was nominated for an Eisner Award for "Best Single Issue (Or One-Shot)" in 2010.

In other media

The Superman/Aquaman Hour of Adventure
An episode of The Superman/Aquaman Hour of Adventure was titled "The Brain, the Brave and the Bold", in which Aquaman battles a supervillain named the "Brain".

Justice League
The Brave and the Bold was used as the title for a two-part episode of the first season of Justice League. The title refers to the Flash (Wally West) and Green Lantern (John Stewart) characters in connection to the second mini-series featuring Barry Allen and Hal Jordan in the roles.

Batman: The Brave and the Bold

An animated series based on the Brave and the Bold concept aired from November 14, 2008, to November 18, 2011. The series features Batman teaming with various characters of the DC Universe, much like the first volume of the ongoing series. The tone of the series is markedly lighter than the previous Batman: The Animated Series and The Batman.

Major characters who appeared in the series include:

Heroes
Adam Strange, Aquaman, the Atom, Batman, Bat-Mite, Black Canary, Black Lightning, Blue Beetle, Booster Gold, the Bronze Tiger, Captain Marvel, Deadman, Doctor Fate, Fire, Firestorm, the Flash, Green Arrow, the Green Lantern Corps, Guy Gardner, Hal Jordan, the Hawk and Dove, Hawkman, the Huntress, Jay Garrick, Jonah Hex, Kamandi, Katana, Metamorpho, OMAC, Plastic Man, the Question, Red Tornado, Vixen, Wildcat, Wonder Woman, and Superman.

Villains
Black Adam, Black Manta, Calendar Man, Cavalier, Clock King, Despero, the Gentleman Ghost, Gorilla Grodd, the Joker, Kanjar Ro, Kite Man, Equinox, Major Disaster, Morgaine Le Fey, the Music Meister, Ocean Master, Shrapnel, the Sportsmaster, the Terrible Trio, the Weeper, and Zebra-Man.

Arrowverse
 The eighth episode of Arrow'''s third season is titled "The Brave and the Bold". The episode is a crossover with The Flash and features a team-up of the title characters of both series.
 In the 2019-2020 crossover Crisis on Infinite Earths'', Lex Luthor calls the team up with him and Marv Novu/The Monitor as "The Brave and The Bold".

References

External links

 The Brave and the Bold at Mike's Amazing World of Comics

1955 comics debuts
1955 establishments in the United States
1983 comics endings
1991 comics debuts
1992 comics endings
1999 comics debuts
2000 comics endings
2001 comics debuts
2001 comics endings
2007 comics debuts
2010 comics endings
Bimonthly magazines published in the United States
Comics magazines published in the United States
Monthly magazines published in the United States
Batman titles
Comics by Bob Haney
Comics by Dennis O'Neil
Comics by Gardner Fox
Comics by George Pérez
Comics by Gerry Conway
Comics by J. Michael Straczynski
Comics by Len Wein
Comics by Mark Waid
Comics by Marv Wolfman
Comics by Michael Fleisher
Comics by Neal Adams
Comics by Paul Kupperberg
Comics by Robert Kanigher
Magazines established in 1955
Magazines disestablished in 1983
Magazines established in 1991
Magazines disestablished in 1992
Magazines established in 1999
Magazines disestablished in 2000
Magazines established in 2001
Magazines disestablished in 2001
Magazines established in 2007
Magazines disestablished in 2010
Team-up comics